Norman Murray (2 November 1908 – 21 August 1967) was an Australian cricketer. He played two first-class matches for Tasmania between 1930 and 1931.

References

External links
 

1908 births
1967 deaths
Australian cricketers
Tasmania cricketers
Cricketers from Perth, Western Australia